Fissurella picta, common name : the painted keyhole limpet, is a species of sea snail, a marine gastropod mollusk in the family Fissurellidae, the keyhole limpets.

Two subspecies : 
 Fissurella picta lata Sowerby, 1835
 Fissurella picta picta (Gmelin, 1791)

Description
The size of an adult shell varies between 35 mm and 100 mm.

Distribution
This marine species is distributed in the Pacific Ocean along Ecuador and in the Atlantic Ocean along the Falkland Islands.

References

 Ramírez-Böhme [= Ramírez Boehme] J. (1974) Nuevas especies chilenas de Lucapina, Fissurella y Collisella (Mollusca, Archaeogastropoda). Boletin, Museo Nacional de Historia Natural [Santiago de Chile] 33: 15-34
 Rosenberg, G. 1992. Encyclopedia of Seashells. Dorset: New York. 224 pp. page(s): 36

External links
 Sowerby, G. B., I. (1835). [Characters of shells collected by Mr. Cuming on the western coast of South America, and among the islands of the South Pacific Ocean. Proceedings of the Zoological Society of London. 1834: 123–128]
 Deshayes G.P. (1830-1832). Encyclopédie méthodique ou par ordre de matières. Histoire naturelle des Vers et Mollusques. Vol. 2, part 1: i-vi, 1-256 [Livraison 101, 1 Feb 1830; part 2: 1-144 [Livraison 101, 1 Feb. 1830], 145-594 [Livraison 102, 29 Sept. 1832]. Vol. 3: 595-1152 [Livraison 102, 29 Sept. 1832 ]
  McLean J.H. (1984) Systematics of Fissurella in the Peruvian and Magellanic faunal provinces (Gastropoda: Prosobranchia). Contributions in Science, Natural History Museum of Los Angeles County 354: 1–70, p. 49. (29 October 1984) 
 

Fissurellidae
Gastropods described in 1791
Taxa named by Johann Friedrich Gmelin